"Melodia" is a song recorded by Polish singer Sanah. The song was released as the second single from her debut studio album Królowa dram on 28 February 2020 through Magic Records, and was written by Sanah, Magdalena Wójcik, Karolina Kozak, and Bogdan Kondracki, while production was handled by Kondracki.

The single reached number 1 on the Polish Airplay Chart, becoming her second chart-topping hit in Poland and was certified diamond.

Music video 
A music video to accompany the release of "Melodia" was released on 28 February 2020 through Sanah's Vevo channel. It was produced in collaboration with THEDREAMS Studio.

Track listing

Charts

Weekly charts

Year-end charts

Certifications

Release history

References

2020 songs
2020 singles
Number-one singles in Poland
Polish-language songs
Sanah (singer) songs